The Noor River (also Nur River) is a river of northern Iran in Mazandaran Province, Noor County. It flows through the Alborz mountain range, generally eastward, past the town of Baladeh into the Haraz River.

Course
The Noor River arises in the west at Labashm Pass at an elevation of 3170 m. It heads generally eastward and enters the Haraz River at an elevation of 700 m.

Part of the course of the Noor River was described in the Scottish Geographical Magazine in 1898 as follows:
"At the Yalu gorge the Nur cuts at right angles through an enormous mass of basalt, forming a rocky defile very remarkable for its gloomy grandeur and dark colouring, so markedly in contrast with the snowwhite precipices of gypsum which rise on either side of the valley at the village of Yalu. The valley is ruggedly picturesque the whole way down to Baladeh, and the river contains trout that took our flies.  At Baladeh, the Nur, passing through a defile, turns sharply east to join the Lar river at Panjab;"

Central Alborz rivers + mountain range map

References

Rivers of Mazandaran Province
Alborz (mountain range)
Tributaries of the Haraz River